Three pillars may refer to:
Three pillars of Sikhism
Three pillars of the European Union
Three Pillars of Chinese Catholicism
Three pillars of sustainability
The Three Pillars of Zen (2000), a book by Philip Kapleau
The three pillars or columns in the Kabbalistic Tree of Life
The three pillars of income support, a policy proposal by The New Physiocrats

See also
Four Pillars (disambiguation)